Cha Jung-won (Hangul: 차정원, born October 23, 1990), known professionally as Car, the Garden (카더가든) and formerly Mayson the Soul (메이슨 더 소울), is a South Korean singer. He released his first EP, Jackasoul, on September 30, 2013. 

The name Car, the Garden was suggested by his friend, Oh Hyuk of Hyukoh. It is a literal translation of his birth name; his last name Cha (차) is a homonym of 'car', while his first name Jung-won (정원) means 'garden'.

Discography

Studio albums

Extended plays

Singles

Soundtrack appearances

Notes

Filmography

Variety shows
 2014: KBS, You Hee-yeol's Sketchbook, August 22
 2017: KBS, You Hee-yeol's Sketchbook, April 15, 22 and 29
 2018: Channel A, Galaxy, (우주를줄게), Ep. 1–10
 2018: Mnet, Finding Heros: Geek Tour, (덕후의 상상은 현실이 된다), Ep. 1–3
 2018–2019: SBS, The Fan, (더팬), Ep. 1–12

Television series

References

1990 births
Living people
21st-century South Korean male  singers